Eucalyptus talyuberlup, commonly known as Stirling Range yate, is a species of small tree or a mallee that is endemic to a small area of the Great Southern region of Western Australia. It has smooth bark, glossy green, narrow lance-shaped adult leaves, flower buds in groups of seven to thirteen, yellowish green flowers and bell-shaped to cup-shaped fruit.

Description
It has smooth pale grey to pinkish bark that is shed in ribbons. Flowering occurs between March and August and the flowers are greenish yellow.

Taxonomy and naming
Eucalyptus talyuberlup was first formally described in 1980 by Denis John Carr and Stella Grace Maisie Carr in the Australian Journal of Botany from specimens they collected in 1974.

Distribution and habitat
The Stirling Range yate usually grows in dense shrubland from the foothills of the Stirling Range to the Kalgan River.

Conservation status
This eucalypt is classified as "not threatened" by the Western Australian Government Department of Parks and Wildlife.

See also
List of Eucalyptus species

References

Eucalypts of Western Australia
talyuberlup
Myrtales of Australia
Mallees (habit)
Plants described in 1980
Taxa named by Maisie Carr